John Trevaskis (9 September 1881 - 20 September 1963) was a Cornish rugby union player who competed in the 1908 Summer Olympics at White City Stadium, London. He also played for St Ives RFC and 10 times for Cornwall. He was a member of the British rugby union team, which on 26 October 1908 won the Olympic silver medal for Great Britain.

See also

Cornish rugby
Rugby union at the 1908 Summer Olympics

References

External links
 

Cornish rugby union players
Rugby union players at the 1908 Summer Olympics
Olympic rugby union players of Great Britain
Olympic silver medallists for Great Britain
1881 births
1963 deaths